Nučice is a municipality and village in Prague-East District in the Central Bohemian Region of the Czech Republic. It has about 400 inhabitants.

History
The first written mention of Nučice is from 1422.

References

Villages in Prague-East District